Laurelia is a genus of plant in the major group Angiosperms (flowering plants) in the family Atherospermataceae, or formerly Monimiaceae. It contains only two species, both endemic to the southern hemisphere, an example of Gondwanan distribution.

 Laurelia novae-zelandiae (native to New Zealand)
 Laurelia sempervirens (native to Chile)

References

Atherospermataceae
Laurales genera
Taxonomy articles created by Polbot